R. S. Mangalam, also known as Raja Singa Mangalam, is a panchayat town in Ramanathapuram district in the Indian state of Tamil Nadu. It is located 35 Kilometres north from the district headquarters Ramanathapuram.

Geography 

R. S. Mangalam is 11 kilometres from the Bay of Bengal and features a humid climate. It is located 35 kilometres north from the district headquarters Ramanathapuram.

R. S. Mangalam is surrounded by Ramanathapuram, Devipattinam, Thondi, Thiruppalaikudi, Nambuthalai, ilayangudi and Paramakudi.

Areas around R. S. Mangalam  
 Ramanathapuram (35 km)
 Paramakudi (37 km)
 Thondi (29 km)
 Chittarkottai (29 km) 
 Nambuthalai (27 km)
 ilayangudi (26 km)
 Tiruvadanai (21 km)
 Devipattinam (21 km)
 Solandur (10 km)
 Thiruppalaikudi (17 km) 
 Uppur, Morepannai (11 km)

Demographics
As of 2011 Indian Census, R. S. Mangalam had a total population of 14,565, of which 7,296 were males and 7,269 were females. Population within the age group of 0 to 6 years was 1,662. The total number of literates in R. S. Mangalam was 11,566, which constituted 79.4% of the population with male literacy of 83.5% and female literacy of 75.3%. The effective literacy rate of 7+ population of R. S. Mangalam was 89.6%, of which male literacy rate was 94.7% and female literacy rate was 84.6%. The Scheduled Castes population was 1,551. R. S. Mangalam had 3481 households in 2011.

As of the 2001 Indian census, R. S. Mangalam had a population of 11,044. Males constituted 49% of the population and females 51%. R. S. Mangalam had an average literacy rate of 67%, higher than the national average of 59.5%: male literacy was 73%, and female literacy was 62%; 12% of the population was below age 6.

References

Cities and towns in Ramanathapuram district